Conisbrough Viaduct is a former railway viaduct, near to Cadeby and Conisbrough in South Yorkshire, England. The height and space were required should shipping need to navigate along the river. The viaduct carried the Dearne Valley Railway over the River Don between 1909 and 1966, after closure it was converted into a foot and cycle path. The structure is grade II listed, and is notable for being one of the first bridges in Britain to be built using a rope system above the viaduct known as a "Blondin".

History
The viaduct connected the Dearne Valley Railway and its associated collieries with Black Carr and Doncaster in the south. The Act of Parliament was approved in 1897. The railway opened in stages, from 1902 onwards, with the final section of trackwork being completed in October 1908, although the viaduct took longer, and was finished in March 1909. A passenger service operated as far as Edlington Halt on the south bank of the River Don between June 1912 and September 1951. Although the viaduct was built to carry two standard gauge lines, only one was laid across the structure which swapped sides along the viaduct, putting "an unusual kink" in the running line.

Each pier is tapered at the bottom, with the foundations sunk into grey shale in the ground. Subsidence was avoided by the contractors purchasing the minerals rights to the land underneath the viaduct, so the coal measures in the vicinity were never worked. Double buttresses with projecting bedstones, were built at either end of the lattice span to help support it.

The viaduct was constructed using an aerial ropeway suspended over the course of the works. The section of track including the viaducts' construction, was the responsibility of Gates & Hogg. Timber used in the construction of the supporting frame, came from those used in the building of the High Level Bridge in Newcastle. After Conisbrough Viaduct was built the timbers, and the Blondin, were re-used for the construction of Leighton Reservoir in North Yorkshire.

The experiences of building the Manchester Ship Canal led to a review of bridge building over waterways at the turn of the 20th century. The main brick used on the viaduct was red brick, but Staffordshire blue bricks were used to face the bridge. The central lattice girder span was engineered by John Butler at the Stanningley ironworks near Leeds. The tender for building the viaduct was awarded in 1906 and cost £4,919.

Closure and re-use
The passenger service across the viaduct was withdrawn in September 1951 but the line over the viaduct remained open for freight until 1966. Whilst the collieries that the line served were still open, subsidence at the viaduct prompted its abandonment, and a new junction was built at the northern end of the line to allow traffic to operate from the northern end only. In April 1985, the disused viaduct was transferred to the British Railways Board (Residuary), and in 2010, Sustrans tarmacked the viaduct as part of the route becoming a long-distance walking and cycling path. The presence of dwarf elder trees in the brickwork led to the possibility of the viaduct being demolished in the 1980s.

In 2015, the viaduct was the setting for a murder scene in the TV series DCI Banks.

See also
Listed buildings in Conisbrough and Denaby

Notes

References

Sources

External links

Image of the viaduct from 1925 showing the girder section over the river

Buildings and structures in the Metropolitan Borough of Doncaster
Railway viaducts in South Yorkshire
Bridges over the River Don, South Yorkshire
Bridges completed in 1909